Jonah Kim (born June 8, 1988), is a South Korean cellist based in the United States. He has been referred to as "the next Yo-Yo Ma" and is known for his "technical finesse" and "romantic and ardent" playing style. Kim made his debut in 2002 with Wolfgang Sawallisch conducting the Philadelphia Orchestra, and has since performed internationally as both soloist and chamber musician.

Born in 1988 to a Protestant pastor, he learned to play the cello by watching and imitating videotapes of Pablo Casals. The seven-year-old Kim was awarded full scholarship to the Juilliard School. He went on to the Curtis Institute of Music in Philadelphia. His primary teachers include Janos Starker, David Cole, Orlando Cole, Peter Wiley and Lynn Harrell. Kim has been involved with the Atlantic Music Festival since its founding in 2009 where he performs annually. Widely considered one of the most technically proficient cellists of all time, he is known for “definitive performances” and has been recorded and broadcast internationally on public radio and television.

References

1988 births
Living people
South Korean cellists
South Korean classical cellists
South Korean expatriates in the United States
Curtis Institute of Music alumni